The Japan women's national football team has represented Japan at the FIFA Women's World Cup on eight occasions in 1991, 1995, 1999, 2003, 2007, 2011, 2015 and 2019. They are the only Asian team to have won the tournament and they are the only team that has won the trophy with a loss during the final tournament.  They also were runners-up once.

1991 World Cup 
The Japanese national team had qualified for the first World Cup as the runners up of the 1991 Asian Championship. Four wins in the preliminary round against Korea DPR, Hong Kong, Malaysia and Singapore. In the semi-final, penalty shoot-out was necessary to eliminate the Republic of China and qualify for the World Cup. The final was then lost with 0: 5 against the China women's national football team, but the first World Cup participation was already there for sure.

In People's Republic of China, the first World Cup match on November 17, 1991 in Foshan was lost 1-0 to Brazil. Two days later, they were followed by a 0-8 against Sweden and another 0-3 against the United States women's national soccer team two days later. This was Japan as the worst team of the tournament eliminated.

Group B

1995 World Cup 
Four years later, the Japanese team finished second in Asian Games 1994 in Hiroshima for the second World Cup. Japan, the Republic of China, the People's Republic of China and South Korea met in a group of four. After a 1-1 draw against the People's Republic of China, both won against the other two teams and then met again in the final, the Chinese won 2-0. Both finalists drove to the World Cup, which took place for the first time on European soil.

In Sweden, the Japanese lost again the opening game 0-1, this time against Germany. On June 7, 1995, but then succeeded the Japanese women in Karlstad against Brazil the first World Cup victory. In the process, Akemi Noda get the first two World Cup goals for Japan after a 1-0 deficit. Against Sweden followed then, although a 0-2, but as the second best group Knights reached the Japanese women the quarterfinals. Here followed a 0-4 defeat against defending USA. However, as the eighth best team, Japan had qualified for the women's first football tournament at the Olympic Games, in which only the eight best teams of the World Cup could participate The seventh best team was not allowed to play in the Olympics, Brazil could participate as the ninth best team .

Quarter-finals

1999 World Cup 

For the third World Cup, Japan finished third in the 1997 AFC Women's Championship. After three preliminary round victories against India, Hong Kong and Guam, with the 21: 0 against Guam the highest international victory succeeded, Japan failed in the semifinals 0-1 North Korea. With a 2: 0 against the Republic of China in the match for third place succeeded but the qualification.

In the USA, the Japanese faced Canada in the first game and scored 1-1. But then followed two defeats against Russia (0: 5) and defending champion Norway (0: 4), which eliminated Japan as group last.

Group C

2003 World Cup
Actually, the World Cup should take place again in the People's Republic of China. Due to the SARS epidemic, the tournament was temporarily relocated to the United States. Thus the World Cup took place for the second time in the USA. As the number of starting places was increased from 12 to 16, a fourth Asian team had the chance to qualify in the AFC / CONCACAF playoffs. Japan took advantage of this opportunity after only fourth place in the Asian Cup 2003. There, the Japanese had the preliminary round against Myanmar, the Republic of China, the Philippines and Guam still with four wins and 34 : 0 goals completed in the semi-finals and match for third place but lost to North Korea 0-3 and South Korea 0-1. In the playoffs, they met Mexico and reached 2: 2 in Mexico City. The second leg in Tokyo was won 2-0 seven days later.

In the USA, the Japanese met in the opening match on World Cup newcomer Argentina and reached the highest score in a World Cup match with the 6-0. The later record national player and goal scorer Homare Sawa scored the first two goals,
Mio even got three. Against the later world champion Germany followed then but a 0-3 and against Canada a 1-3. With that, Japan became only a group third. However, since after the increase of the field of participants only all group winners and second came in the knockout round, Japan retired as second best group third.

Group C

2007 World Cup 
Four years later, Japan had to go through the playoffs. At 2006 AFC Women's Asian Cup in Australia, which has been part of the Asian Association since 2006, only fourth place was taken. After three wins in the preliminary round against the People's Republic of China, the Republic of China and Vietnam became the semi-final against hosts Australia 0-2 and also the game for place 3 against North Korea 2: 3 lost. Again Mexico were in the playoffs of the opponents and this time Japan had first home right. In Tokyo, a 2-0 was submitted, so that the 1: 2 could be dealt a week later in Toluca.

In China, as four years earlier, Argentina and Germany were the group opponents, as well as for the first time England, against which in the first game a 2: 2 was achieved. After a 1-0 win over Argentina, Japan and defending champions Germany had both four points ahead of the final group game, ahead of England, who had drawn twice. However, as Japan lost 2-0 to Germany, while England beat Argentina 6-1, Germany became the group winners and then again World Champions and England ahead of Japan's runners-up, who eliminated them.

Group A

2011 World Cup 

For the World Cup in Germany, Japan qualified again without detour. At 2010 Asian Cup, for which Japan was directly qualified, third place was taken. The preliminary round was again sovereign with three wins over North Korea, Thailand and Myanmar. In the semifinals, however, was then lost to the eventual Asian champion Australia 0-1. With a 2: 0 in the match for third place against arch-rivals China succeeded but the qualification. As the fourth-placed Asian team this time had no way to qualify for intercontinental playoffs, the first women's World Cup final without the People's Republic of China took place.

In Germany, Japan met New Zealand in the first match and won 2-1. This was followed by a 4-0 win over Mexico, with Homare Sawa scoring three goals. Thus, Japan was already qualified before the last group match for the knockout round, so that the subsequent 0-2 defeat against England could be coped. However, Japan was only second to the group and met in the quarterfinals host and defending champion Germany, who wanted to win the title for the third consecutive year the title and against whom Japan had never won before. Despite stormy attacks, the German team managed in 120 minutes but no goal, but could Karina Maruyama in the 108th minute a counterattack to 1: 0 and thus complete the first victory over Germany and reach the semi-finals of a World Cup for the first time. In the semifinals, Japan met Sweden and was already 10 minutes behind, but equalized eight minutes later. It remained until the half-time break. In the second half, the Japanese could then add two more goals and reach the final. Here they met United States, against whom they had never won before, and were again defeated again, this time by a counterattack against them. This could be compensated in the 81st minute, which gave it an extension. Again, the Japanese fell behind in the back. However, Homare Sawa was able to equalize with her fifth tournament goal, making her the tournament's top scorer three minutes from the end of extra time. Although Azusa Iwashimizu received the Red Card in injury time, it stayed that way, so Penalties had to decide on the World Cup title. As Japanese goalkeeper Ayumi Kaihori was only 170 cm tall and held two penalties for the US and also scored one while three Japanese women converted and only one failed, Japan became the first Asian side to become World Cup champions. Homare Sawa was also awarded the Golden Ball for best player and Japan for the fairest team.

Group B

Quarter-finals

Semi-finals

Final

2015 World Cup 
Qualification, which was again hosted by Asian Cup, Japan was the first Asian champion. In the preliminary round were clearly beaten after a draw against Australia, Vietnam and Jordan (4: 0 and 7: 0). In the semifinals, Japan won 2-1 after extra time against the People's Republic of China and won 1-0 in the final.

When the groups were drawn, Japan was set and was defined as group head of group C.  The Japanese have been awarded the three World Cup newcomers Switzerland, Cameroon and Ecuador which Japan had not played before.

Japan could won all three group matches for the first time and moved in as a group winners in the quarterfinals. The goals were all in the first half hour and then the Japanese were content to largely manage the result. Also in the last sixteen against the Netherlands they went early in the lead, but then put in the second half still a goal. In injury time, they still conceded the goal, but this time brought the result over time. Against Australia - against which they had become Asia champions 1-0 for the first time Asian champions - they had to wait but then until the 87th minute before then the winning goal and thus the second semi-final entry succeeded. There they met England, against which four years earlier in the preliminary round last time a World Cup match was lost and never won. In a balanced game, both were awarded a penalty, which they could transform. Thereafter, the mutual efforts to achieve the winning goal were fruitless. Only in stoppage time did the Laura Bassett make an own goal, which allowed her to make her final rerun of 2011. In the final, the Japanese fell behind with 0: 2 already after five minutes, after 16 minutes it was 0: 4, so the game was almost decided. Although the Japanese managed to make tactical changes and substitutions of two players before the break, and a a. Record national player Homare Sawa the 1: 4. When shortly after the break, the United States gave the Japanese an own goal, came up briefly hope again, but already two minutes later fell to the 2: 5-final. Thus, Japan could not imitate the German team and not defend the title. Aya Miyama was awarded the bronze ball as the third best player.

Group C

Round of 16

Quarter-finals

Semi-finals

Final

2019 World Cup 
In the Qualification for the World Cup in France, for which Asian women were again given five starting positions, Japan qualified by reaching the semi-finals of the 2018 AFC Women's Asian Cup. For this championship, which takes place in April 2018 in Jordan, Japan was automatically qualified. In the first game against Vietnam, a 4-0 was achieved, the second game against South Korea ended goalless. In the decisive third group match against Australia, which also drew 0-0 against South Korea but won 8-0 against Vietnam, Japan were 1-0 ahead after 63 minutes and would have been group winners in that event. However, four minutes before the end of the game, Sam Kerr scored the 1-1 draw for Australia, and as they stayed 4-0 in South Korea's parallel with Vietnam, Japan were second in the Asian Cup semi-finals also reached the World Cup finals. In the semifinals, Japan defeated China 3-1 and defended their title 1-0 in the final against Australia.

At the World Cup, the Japanese, as in 2007, met Argentina and England, and for the first time in a World Cup match, the World Cup newcomer Scotland. The Japanese started with a disappointing goalless draw against Argentina, the first time they could win a championship point. Against Scotland they increased and won 2-1. Against England they had few chances to score and lost 0-2. As Argentina and Scotland drew in a draw, it was enough for the second group place, which they met in the second round of the European Championship Netherlands. The Japanese were already in the 17th minute after a corner in the back, but could then make the game but balanced and became more dominant with increasing time, but needed until the 43rd Minute equalizer. In the second half, they were the better team, but could not use their scoring chances. When the teams were already prepared for an extension, there was a penalty in the final minute for the Dutch women, they used to victory goal. Thus, the Japanese eliminated as the last Asian team, which is the first time no Asian team in the quarter-finals, as previously Australia and China have lost their first knockout round games against European teams and South Korea and Thailand have already eliminated in the group stage.

Group D

Round of 16

FIFA World Cup record

*Draws include knockout matches decided via penalty shoot-out.

Goalscorers 

 Own goals scored for opponents
 Sayuri Yamaguchi (scored for Sweden in 1991)
 Hiromi Isozaki (scored for Norway in 1999)

References

 
World Cup
Countries at the FIFA Women's World Cup